Şorabad, Şuraabad (?-2018) (also, Mikhailabad, Shuraabad, Sovetabad, and Soviet Abad) is a village and municipality in the Khizi Rayon of Azerbaijan.  It has a population of 2,232.  The municipality consists of the villages of Şuraabad, Yaşma, and Türkoba.

References 

Populated places in Khizi District